The Kahuzi-Biega National Park is a protected area near Bukavu town in eastern Democratic Republic of the Congo. It is situated near the western bank of Lake Kivu and the Rwandan border. Established in 1970 by the Belgian photographer and conservationist Adrien Deschryver, the park is named after two dormant volcanoes, Mount Kahuzi and Mount Biega, which are within its limits. Set in both mountainous and lowland terrain, it is one of the last refuges of the rare species of Eastern lowland gorilla (Gorilla beringei graueri), an endangered category under the IUCN Red List. The park is a UNESCO World Heritage Site, inscribed in 1980 for its unique biodiversity of rainforest habitat and its eastern lowland gorillas. In 1997, it was listed on the List of World Heritage in Danger because of the political instability of the region, an influx of refugees, and increasing wildlife exploitation.

Geography
A small part of the park is in Mitumba Mountain range of the Albertine Rift in the Great Rift Valley, and the larger part is in lowland terrain. A corridor of  width joins the mountainous and lowland terrain. Two dormant volcanoes are set within the park's limits and lend their names to it: Kahuzi and Biéga.

Legal status
The earliest reserve, Zoological and Forest Reserve of Mount Kahuzi, was created on 27 July 1937 by the then Governor General of the Belgian Colonial administration. That reserve has been part of the Kahuzi-Biega National Park since November 1970. Five years later, the park was extended to cover 6000 km2. The park was declared a UNESCO World Heritage Site in 1980, under Criterion (x) for its unique habitat of rainforest and diversity of the mammal species, particularly the eastern lowland gorillas, Gorilla beringei graueri.

Biodiversity

The park has a rich diversity of flora and fauna. As of a survey conducted in 2003 by the Wildlife Conservation Society, it protects roughly 349 species of birds and 136 species of mammals. Over 1,178 plant species have been observed in the highland regions of the park alone. Because of its varied topography and habitat types, Kahuzi-Biega National Park is also a hotspot of plants and vertebrate endemism for.

Flora
The park's swamps, bogs, marshland and riparian forests on hydromorphic ground at all altitudes are rare worldwide. The montane rain forests are part of the Albertine Rift montane forests ecoregion.

Fauna
The national park protects a greater diversity of mammal species than any other national park in the Albertine Rift. Among the 136 species of mammals identified in the park, the eastern lowland gorilla is the most prominent. According to a 2008 status report of the DR of Congo, the park had 125 lowland gorillas, a marked reduction from the figure of 600 gorillas of the pre-1990's conflict period, and consequently the species has been listed in the endangered list. The park is the last refuge of this rare species. According to the census survey of eastern lowland gorillas reported by the Wildlife Conservation Society in April 2011, at least 181 gorillas were recorded in the park.

Other primates include the eastern chimpanzee, and several Cercopithecinae, Colobinae and owl-faced monkey. Some of the mammals include the bush elephant, bush buffalo, hylochere and bongo, eastern needle-clawed galago, Maclaud's horseshoe bat, Ruwenzori least otter shrew, and Alexander's bush squirrel. Two species of genet (animal) that live within the park are endemic to the Congo Basin: the aquatic genet and the giant forest genet.

Of the 349 bird species identified within the park, at least 42 of them are endemic to the region, including the threatened Albertine owlet. Other native bird species include the Yellow-crested Helmet-shrike (Prionops alberti), the Congo peafowl (Afropavo congensis), the African green broadbill (Pseudocalyptomena graueri), and the Rockefeller's sunbird (Nectarinia rockefelleri). 
 
The species of fauna listed under the IUCN Red List as threatened include:
 

The species of fauna listed under the IUCN Red List as least concern or near threatened include:
 

A 2020 survey of the freshwater fish in the park and its three drainage basins identified 147 species, 11 of which were found to be endemic to the Lowa River basin, and 7 of which were previously undescribed.
Cyprinidae was by far the largest family represented.

Conservation
The park, under the management of the Institut Congolais pour la Conservation de la Nature, has a basic management and surveillance structure. However, the park's 1975 expansion, which included inhabited lowland areas, resulted in forced evacuations with about 13,000 people of the tribal community of Shi, Tembo and Rega affected and refusing to leave.
Cooperation by the communities living around the park and employment of the Twa people to enforce park protection was pursued by the park authorities. In 1999 a plan was developed to protect the people and the resources of the park.

In a survey conducted between 2015 and 2016, the national park rangers reported a low level of satisfaction with the job, highlighting low salaries, lack of support from the authorities, and poor living conditions.

See also
 World Heritage Sites in Danger

References

Further reading

External links

Kahuzi Biega National Park Official Website

National parks of the Democratic Republic of the Congo
Protected areas established in 1970
South Kivu
World Heritage Sites in Danger
World Heritage Sites in the Democratic Republic of the Congo
1970 establishments in Africa
Northeastern Congolian lowland forests
Albertine Rift montane forests